Bascanichthys is a genus of eels in the snake eel family Ophichthidae. It currently contains the following species:

 Bascanichthys bascanium (D. S. Jordan, 1884) (Sooty eel)
 Bascanichthys bascanoides R. C. Osburn & Nichols, 1916 (Sooty sand-eel)
 Bascanichthys ceciliae Blache & Cadenat, 1971
 Bascanichthys congoensis Blache & Cadenat, 1971
 Bascanichthys cylindricus Meek & Hildebrand, 1923 (Round sand-eel)
 Bascanichthys deraniyagalai Menon, 1961 (Indian longtailed sand-eel)
 Bascanichthys fijiensis (Seale, 1935)
 Bascanichthys filaria (Günther, 1872)
 Bascanichthys gaira (Moreno, Acero P. & Grijalba-Bendeck, 2016)  
 Bascanichthys inopinatus McCosker, E. B. Böhlke & J. E. Böhlke, 1989
 Bascanichthys kirkii (Günther, 1870) (Longtailed sand-eel)
 Bascanichthys longipinnis (Kner & Steindachner, 1867)
 Bascanichthys myersi (Herre, 1932)
 Bascanichthys panamensis Meek & Hildebrand, 1923 (Panama sand-eel)
 Bascanichthys paulensis Storey, 1939
 Bascanichthys pusillus Seale, 1917
 Bascanichthys scuticaris (Goode & T. H. Bean, 1880) (Whip eel)
 Bascanichthys sibogae (M. C. W. Weber, 1913)

References

 

Ophichthidae
Taxa named by David Starr Jordan